The Fighting Fist of Shanghai Joe (Italian: Il mio nome è Shanghai Joe, lit. "My name is Shanghai Joe") is a 1973 Spaghetti Western kung fu film directed by Mario Caiano and starring Chen Lee as Shanghai Joe. The film was released in a number of alternate titles in the United States, including To Kill or to Die and The Dragon Strikes Back.

Plot
A Chinese immigrant skilled in martial arts arrives in America and travels to Texas looking for honest work.  Wherever he goes he encounters racism.  He soon impinges on the interests of a slave trader called Spencer, which results in a price being put on his head.  "Shanghai Joe" uses his martial arts expertise to free the Mexican slaves from their cruel master. Spencer and his friends then hire the four most terrifying bounty hunters of the West, among them a cannibal, a scalp hunter, a killer who skins his victims, and another martial arts champion, his old friend Mikuja.

Cast
 Chen Lee (Myoshin Hayakawa) - Shanghai Joe 
 Carla Romanelli - Cristina
 Gordon Mitchell - Buryin' Sam
 Klaus Kinski - Scalper Jack
 Katsutoshi Mikuriya - Mikuja
 Robert Hundar - Pedro, the Cannibal
 Giacomo Rossi-Stuart - Triky, the gamber
 Piero Lulli - Spencer
 Carla Mancini - Conchita
 George Wang - Yang
 Rick Boyd - Slim
 Umberto D'Orsi - Poker player
 Dante Maggio - Doctor
 Francisco Sanz - Cristina's Father

DVD release
On May 26, 2009, a Region 0 DVD of the movie was released by Alpha Video.

References

External links

1973 films
1970s Italian-language films
Spaghetti Western films
Films directed by Mario Caiano
Films scored by Bruno Nicolai
1973 Western (genre) films
Films shot in Almería
1970s Italian films